Red: Werewolf Hunter is a 2010 television horror film, loosely based on the story of Little Red Riding Hood. It is a Syfy television film, produced by Toronto-based Chesler/Perlmutter Productions. It premiered on Syfy on October 30, 2010, and released to DVD on January 3, 2012.

Plot
Virginia (Felicia Day), modern-day descendant of Little Red Riding Hood, brings her fiancé, Nathan (Kavan Smith), home to meet her family. Virginia's grandmother (Rosemary Dunsmore) and brother Jake (David Reale) welcome Virginia back, with Jake calling her "Red", a family nickname of the first daughter in every generation. Shortly after their arrival, Nathan finds a man staggering up the driveway half dead. The dying man says the name "Gabriel" before Nathan runs for Virginia. When they return, the man is already ashes. The sheriff, who is Virginia's other brother Marcus (Greg Bryk), arrives and contains the situation, much to Nathan's dismay. Virginia takes Nathan inside and explains that they hunt werewolves. Nathan, not believing her, goes for a walk at sunset. He is attacked and bitten by a werewolf who reveals his name to be Gabriel (Stephen McHattie). The next day, while preparing for a hunt, Nathan asks if they had ever turned a werewolf back. Virginia tells him that the only way to break the curse is to kill the werewolf who turned the person, before the newly bitten werewolf kills a human. Shortly after, they go hunting in town where Nathan kills a werewolf. After the wolves are dead, they find a girl locked in their car's trunk. She tells them that the wolves are planning on a "Game" that no human survives. Later that night, while setting up camp, Nathan transforms into a werewolf for the first time. Desperate to protect him, Virginia insists on locking him up for the night. Nathan awakens the next morning in a cell. With the curse over for the night, he is released for the day, to help hunt Gabriel. Back in town, Marcus and Jake are taken captive for the new "Game". When the night comes to an end, it is revealed that the brothers were killed.

The next day, the family prepare for a final battle, and Gabriel seizes the moment to kidnap Virginia. Nathan finds the brothers shortly before finding Virginia. The couple return home and finish preparations for the full moon. As the sun goes down, the battle begins. Nathan is locked in his cage with the grandmother watching him. Red kills several of the werewolves who enter the house, before confronting Gabriel. Meanwhile, the grandmother tries to shoot Nathan as he turns into a werewolf. Upon escaping from the cell, Nathan, in werewolf form, kills the grandmother. Upstairs, Virginia is pursued by Gabriel. After covering her blood stained hand in silver paint, she smears it on Gabriel, who falls over the rail, two stories. Virginia jumps after him, plunging a silver headed harpoon into his heart. As he dies, Virginia hears the howl of a werewolf. Fearing the worst, she flees to the basement to see Nathan, but finds her grandmother dead. Grabbing a red cloak, Virginia runs to the woods to find Nathan. Werewolf Nathan attacks Virginia, knocking her out. In the morning, Virginia discovers she's been bitten. Several feet from where she fell was a trail of blood leading to an old ruined building. Inside, Nathan is human again. He pledges his love to Virginia, saying he wants a life with her. As he hugs her, Virginia stabs him with a silver knife, swearing she'll always love him.  With his death, the curse on Virginia is broken.  The film ends with her reading the story of Little Red Riding Hood to her daughter as a wolf howls in the distance.

Cast
 Felicia Day as Virginia "Red" Sullivan
 Kavan Smith as Nathan, Red's Fiancé
 Greg Bryk as Marcus Sullivan
 David Reale as Jake Sullivan
 Steven McHattie as Gabriel
 Rosemary Dunsmore as Grandmother Sullivan

Home media
It was released on DVD on January 3, 2012.

References

External links
 
 Red: Werewolf Hunter at Zap2it.com

2010 television films
Canadian horror television films
English-language Canadian films
2010 horror films
Canadian werewolf films
Canadian supernatural horror films
Films based on Little Red Riding Hood
Syfy original films
American action horror films
American supernatural horror films
Canadian vigilante films
American dark fantasy films
Canadian fantasy films
2010 fantasy films
Supernatural action films
Supernatural fantasy films
2010s supernatural horror films
American vigilante films
2010 films
2010s exploitation films
Films directed by Sheldon Wilson
2010s American films
2010s Canadian films